

Chapter List
The chartered chapters of Kappa Pi are:

References

Kappa Pi